Minuto may refer to:

 Alessandro Minuto-Rizzo (born 1940), Italian diplomat
 Anna Carmela Minuto (born 1969), Italian politician

See also 

 Minuto, TV programme in the Philippines
 Minto (disambiguation)
 Minute

Surnames
Surnames of Italian origin
Italian-language surnames